James Won-Ki Hong (born September 28, 1959) is Director of Innovation Center for Education (since Nov. 2019), Co-Director of Cetner for Crypto Blockchain Research (since Feb. 2020), and Professor of Dept. of Computer Science and Engineering (since May 1995) at POSTECH. He served as Dean of Graduate of Information Technology at POSTECH from 2015 to 2019. He was Senior Executive Vice President and CTO of KT Corporation leading R&D activities from March 2012 to Feb. 2014. He received a Ph.D. degree from the University of Waterloo in 1991. His research interests include blockchain, network management, network monitoring and network analysis, ICT convergence, ubiquitous computing, and smartphonomics. He has served as Chair (2005–2009) of the IEEE Communications Society (IEEE ComSoc), Committee on Network Operations and Management. He has also served IEEE ComSoc Director of Online Content (2004–2005, 2010–2011). He is Editor-in-Chief of International Journal on Network Management (IJNM) and of ComSoc Technology News. He is the Chair of Steering Committee of IEEE IFIP NOMS International Symposium on Integrated Network Management and Steering Committee member of APNOMS. He was General Chair of APNOMS 2006, and General Co-Chair of APNOMS 2008 and APNOMS 2011. He was General Co-Chair of IFIPS NOMS 2010. He is an editorial board member of Transactions on Network and Service Management, Journal of Network and Systems Management and Journal of Communications and Networks.

Education
 Ph.D. in Computer Science, University of Waterloo (1991)
 M.S. in Computer Science, University of Western Ontario (1985)
 HBSc. in Computer Science, University of Western Ontario (1983)

Professional activities
 Executive Director, SDN/NFV Forum (2014–present)
 Chairman of the National Intelligence Communication Enterprise Association (2013-2014)
 Member of IEEE Future Directions Committee (FDC) Industry Advisory Board (IAB) (2013-2014)
 Member of Private Enterprise Advisory Committee of Global Green Growth Institute
 Chairman of ICT Standardization Committee, Telecommunications Technology Association (TTA)
 Editor-in-Chief, International Journal of Network Management, Wiley & Sons (2012. 1-present)
 Editor-in-Chief, IEEE Communications Society Technology News, IEEE (2012. 1–2014.12)
 Editorial Board Member, IEEE Transactions on Network and Service Management (2004–present)
 Editorial Advisory Board Member, Journal of Network and Systems Management, Springer (2005–present)
 General Chair, International Conference on Blockchain and Cryptocurrency, May 15–17, 2019, Seoul, Korea
 General Chair, IEEE NetSoft 2016
 General Co-Chair, IEEE NOMS 2018, NOMS 2010
 General Chair APNOMS 2006, General Co-Chair APNOMS 2008
 Steering Committee Member, IEEE NOMS/IM and APNOMS
 Editorial Board Member, IEEE TNSM, JNSM, IJNM, JTM
 Chair (2005–2009), Vice Chair (2003–2005), Technical Chair (1998–2000), IEEE Communications Society CNOM
 Director of Online Content, IEEE Communications Society (2010–present)
 Editor-in-Chief, KNOM Review Journal
 EMANICS Scientific Council Member
 TMF University Program (UP) Core Team Member
 Technical Program Co-Chair, NOMS 2000, APNOMS'99

Professional experience
 1995.5 - present: Professor, Dept. of Computer Science and Engineering, POSTECH
 2012.3 - 2014.2: CTO & Senior Executive Vice President of KT
 2009.3 - 2012.2: Head & Professor, Division of IT Convergence Engineering, POSTECH
 2007.3 - 2011.2, 2015.11 - present: Dean, Graduate School of Information Technology, POSTECH
 2008.12 - 2010.2: Head, Dept. of Computer Science and Engineering, POSTECH
 2007.9 - 2010.2: Director, POSTECH Information Research Laboratories, POSTECH
 2004.9 - 2005.8: Visiting Professor, Dept. of Electrical and Computer Engineering, University of Toronto
 2000.6 - 2002.2: Co-Founder & Chief Technology Officer, Netstech, Inc., Seoul, Korea
 2000.1 - 2000.5: Co-Founder & Chief Software Architect, Yute Systems, Pohang, Korea

Selected publications
 Young J. Won, Mi-Jung Choi, James W. Hong, Chan-Kyu Hwang, and Jae-Hyoung Yoo, "Measurement of Download and Play and Streaming IPTV Traffic Vol. 46, No. 10, p.154–161" IEEE Communications Magazine, October 2008, 
 Young J. Won, Mi-Jung Choi, James Won-Ki Hong, Myung-Sup Kim, Hwawon Hwang, Jun-Hyub Lee, and Sung-Gyoo Lee, "Fault Detection and Diagnosis in IP-based Mission Critical Industrial Process Control Networks," IEEE Communications Magazine, Vol. 46, No. 5, May 2008, pp. 172~180.
 Mi-Jung Choi, Hong-Taek Ju, James Won-Ki Hong and Dong-Sik Yun, "Design and Implementation of Web Services-based NGOSS Technology Specific Architecture," Annals of Telecommunications, Special Issue on 'Next Generation Network and Service Management', Vol. 63, No. 3-4, April 2008, pp. 195~206.
 Byung-Chul Park, Young J. Won, Myung-Sup Kim, and James Won-Ki Hong, "Towards Automated Application Signature Generation for Traffic Identification", 11th IEEE/IFIP Network Operations and Management Symposium (NOMS 2008), Salvador, Bahia, Brazil, April 7–11, 2008, pp. 160–167.
 Myung-Sup Kim, Young J. Won, and James W. Hong, "Characteristic Analysis of Internet Traffic from the Perspective of Flows," Computer Communications, Volume 29, Issue 10, June 19, 2006, pp. 1639–1652
 Mi-Jung Choi, Hyoun-Mi Choi, Hong-Taek Ju, and James Won-Ki Hong, "XML-based Configuration Management for IP Network Devices", IEEE Communications Magazine, Vol. 41, No. 7, July 2004. pp. 84–91.
 Other publications searched on Microsoft Academic Search

References

External links 
 ITCE(Division of IT Convergence Engineering) Official Homepage, from September 2009, http://itce.postech.ac.kr/.
 Prof. James Won-Ki Hong's Publication List, last updated in March 2011, http://dpnm.postech.ac.kr/publication.html/.
 DPNM Laboratory Homepage, http://dpnm.postech.ac.kr/.
 POSTECH(Pohang University of Science and Technology) Official Homepage, http://www.postech.ac.kr/.
 ITCE Blog, This blog periodically updates news on ITCE.
 ITCE Facebook(SNS on ITCE), https://www.facebook.com/pages/ITCE/155073584536682/.
 ITCE YouTube, https://www.youtube.com/user/ITConvE/. ITCE periodically uploads lectures and videos related to this department.
 The IEEE Communications Society's Website, http://www.comsoc.org/.

1959 births
Living people
University of Western Ontario alumni
University of Waterloo alumni
Academic staff of the University of Toronto
Academic staff of Pohang University of Science and Technology
South Korean computer scientists
South Korean engineers
Place of birth missing (living people)
People from Pohang